Frits Mulder was a sailor from Belgium, who represented his country at the 1928 Summer Olympics in Amsterdam, Netherlands. Mulder, as crew member on the Belgian 6 Metre Ubu, took 5th place with helmsman A. J. J. Fridt and fellow crew members Ludovic Franck, Willy Van Rompaey and Arthur Sneyers.

Sources

External links
 

Sailors at the 1928 Summer Olympics – 6 Metre
Olympic sailors of Belgium
Belgian male sailors (sport)